Garden Spur is a spur on the west side of the Longhorn Spurs,  south of Cape Surprise, Antarctica. It was so named by the Southern Party of the New Zealand Geological Survey Antarctic Expedition (1963–64) because of the rich flora of mosses, algae, and lichens found there.

References

Ridges of the Ross Dependency
Dufek Coast